Grey Mountains could be:

 Grey Mountains in J. R. R. Tolkien's Middle-earth fiction Ered Mithrin
 Grey Mountains in the fictional Warhammer Fantasy (setting) by Games Workshop